Liangmao Hill station, is a station on Line 10 of the Shenzhen Metro. It opened on August 18, 2020.

Station layout

Exits

References

Shenzhen Metro stations
Railway stations in Guangdong
Longgang District, Shenzhen
Railway stations in China opened in 2020